Kreisleriana, Op. 16, is a composition in eight movements by Robert Schumann for solo piano, subtitled . Schumann claimed to have written it in only four days in April 1838 and a revised version appeared in 1850. The work was dedicated to Frédéric Chopin, but when a copy was sent to the Polish composer, "he commented favorably only on the design of the title page".

Kreisleriana is a very dramatic work and is viewed by some critics as one of Schumann's finest compositions. In 1839, soon after publishing it, Schumann called it in a letter "my favourite work," remarking that "The title conveys nothing to any but Germans. Kreisler is one of E. T. A. Hoffmann's creations, an eccentric, wild, and witty conductor." In 1843, when he had moved from writing for solo piano to much larger works, in particular Paradise and the Peri, he still listed it as one of his best piano works.

The work's title was inspired by the character of Johannes Kreisler from works of E. T. A. Hoffmann. Like the kaleidoscopic Kreisler, each number has multiple contrasting sections, resembling the imaginary musician's manic depression, and recalling Schumann's own "Florestan" and "Eusebius," the two characters Schumann used to indicate his own contrasting impulsive and dreamy sides.

In a letter to his wife Clara, Schumann reveals that she has figured largely in the composition of Kreisleriana:

Movements 

  (Extremely animated), D minor
  (Very inwardly and not too quickly), B major. This movement in ABACA form, with its lyrical main theme, includes two contrasting intermezzi. In his 1850 edition, Schumann extended the first reprise of the theme by twenty measures in order to repeat it in full.
  (Very agitated), G minor
  (Very slowly), B major/G minor
  (Very lively), G minor
  (Very slowly), B major
  (Very fast), C minor/E major
  (Fast and playful), G minor. Schumann used material from this movement in the fourth movement of his first symphony.

References

External links 
 
 Piano Society: Kreisleriana op. 16 Much more detailed analysis and description
 Performance of Kreisleriana by Jonathan Biss from the Isabella Stewart Gardner Museum in MP3 format
, 
, Leon McCawley

Adaptations of works by E. T. A. Hoffmann
Piano music by Robert Schumann
Compositions for solo piano
1838 compositions
Composer tributes (classical music)
Music with dedications